Huisken is a Dutch surname. Notable people with the surname include:

Carl Huisken (1902–1987), Dutch Olympic sailor 
Gerhard Huisken (born 1958), German mathematician
Huisken's monotonicity formula

See also
Huiskens

Dutch-language surnames